Zelimkhan Abakarov (born 14 July 1993) is a Russian-born Albanian wrestler of Chechen origin. He is a gold medalist at the 2022 World Wrestling Championships. He is the first wrestler representing Albania to win a gold medal at the World Wrestling Championships. He is also a gold medalist at the 2022 Mediterranean Games and a silver medalist at the 2021 Islamic Solidarity Games.

Career 

He won one of the bronze medals in his event at the Golden Grand Prix Ivan Yarygin 2022 held in Krasnoyarsk, Russia. He competed in the men's freestyle 61 kg and men's Greco-Roman 67 kg events at the 2022 European Wrestling Championships held in Budapest, Hungary.

He won the gold medal in the men's freestyle 65 kg event at the 2022 Mediterranean Games held in Oran, Algeria. He won the silver medal in his event at the 2021 Islamic Solidarity Games held in Konya, Turkey. He won the gold medal in the men's 57kg event at the 2022 World Wrestling Championships held in Belgrade, Serbia.

Achievements

References

External links 
 

Living people
1993 births
Albanian male sport wrestlers
Russian male sport wrestlers
Mediterranean Games gold medalists for Albania
Mediterranean Games medalists in wrestling
Competitors at the 2022 Mediterranean Games
Islamic Solidarity Games competitors for Albania
Islamic Solidarity Games medalists in wrestling
21st-century Albanian people
20th-century Russian people
World Wrestling Champions
People from Khasavyurt